Richard Simm was a Bohemian luger who competed in the early 1910s. He won a bronze medal in the men's singles event at the inaugural European championships of 1914 in Reichenberg, Bohemia (now Liberec, Czech Republic).

References
List of European luge champions 

 

Bohemian male lugers
Czechoslovak male lugers
Year of birth missing
Year of death missing